Arbo is a municipality in Galicia, in the province of Pontevedra.

References

Municipalities in the Province of Pontevedra